John Henry Murphy (1858 – March 7, 1905) was an American professional baseball pitcher. He played in Major League Baseball in 1884 with Altoona Mountain City and the Wilmington Quicksteps. He was born in Philadelphia, Pennsylvania.

Sources

1858 births
1905 deaths
Major League Baseball pitchers
Wilmington Quicksteps players
Altoona Mountain Citys players
19th-century baseball players
Baseball players from Philadelphia
Wilmington Quicksteps (minor league) players
Trenton Trentonians players
Scranton Indians players
Jersey City Jerseys players
Altoona (minor league baseball) players